Martin Hermann Faber (1586–1648), was a German painter, architect, and cartographer.

He was born in Emden and made a trip southwards to Italy in 1611 where he met the "Caravaggist" Louis Finson. He travelled extensively with Finson and worked with him in France, but was back in Emden in 1618 where he joined the Emden Guild of St. Luke. He remained a member until 1629, and his sons Berend and Hermann II also became members of the guild.
He died in Emden.

References

Martin Hermann Faber on Artnet

1586 births
1648 deaths
German painters
German male painters
17th-century German architects
People from Emden
Painters from Emden